Ramlal Malviya is an Indian politician and member of the  Indian National Congress. Malviya is a member of the Madhya Pradesh Legislative Assembly from the Ghatiya constituency in Ujjain district.

References 

People from Ujjain
Bharatiya Janata Party politicians from Madhya Pradesh
Living people
21st-century Indian politicians
Year of birth missing (living people)
Indian National Congress politicians from Madhya Pradesh
Madhya Pradesh MLAs 1998–2003
Madhya Pradesh MLAs 2008–2013
Madhya Pradesh MLAs 2018–2023